Delmo Delmastro (born 15 August 1936) is a former Argentine cyclist. He competed in the individual road race and team time trial events at the 1964 Summer Olympics.

References

External links
 

1936 births
Living people
Argentine male cyclists
Olympic cyclists of Argentina
Cyclists at the 1964 Summer Olympics
Place of birth missing (living people)
Pan American Games medalists in cycling
Pan American Games gold medalists for Argentina
Pan American Games bronze medalists for Argentina
Cyclists at the 1963 Pan American Games
Medalists at the 1963 Pan American Games
20th-century Argentine people